Brafferton and Helperby is a civil parish in the Hambleton District of North Yorkshire, England. Up until 2019, both Brafferton and Helperby were in their own civil parishes, but a vote, and then later an order was convened, to amalgamate the two into one parish covering both villages.

History
The ancient (ecclesiastical) parish of Brafferton, also included Helperby within the parish domain. When civil parishes were introduced, the two villages were separated out, but are a contiguous settlement with Brafferton at the north end, and Helperby at the south end. On 1 April 2019, the two parishes were combined into one civil parish – Brafferton and Helperby, with seven elected council members. Previous to this, each council had five members.

Local authority
Historically, the ecclesiastical parish of Brafferton included Helperby and Thornton Bridge, where Helperby was described as a township. Both previous civil parishes were instituted in 1894, both fulfilling the requirements of a local government act of 1889, which stipulated anywhere with 200 or more voters, could have a parish council. In 1999, the two separate civil parishes of Brafferton and Helperby pooled their money and resources to build a new village hall, which is situated in Helperby next to the war memorial.

At the 2011 Census, Brafferton had a population of 311 and Helperby had 520. In 2015, North Yorkshire County Council estimated that the two villages had a population of 820 people – 300 in Brafferton and 520 in Helperby.

References

External links

Brafferton and Helperby Parish Council website
Map of the parish
Previous boundaries of the two civil parishes

Civil parishes in North Yorkshire
Hambleton District